Rechelkopf is a mountain of Bavaria, Germany.

Bavarian Prealps
Mountains of the Alps